Charles Eustache Gabriel (29 July 1788 - October 1862), known as Rainulphe d'Osmond, count then 5th Marquis (1838) of Osmond. He was one of the menins to duc d'Angoulême (dauphin from the accession of Charles X in 1824).

Career
He was one of the menins (essentially a young nobleman who was made a companion of royal children) to Louis, duc d'Angoulême (dauphin from the accession of Charles X in 1824). As recorded in the memoirs of Queen Hortense, he asked for the post of Chamberlain to Holland, but was denied by the King of Holland Louis Bonaparte (the younger brother of Napoleon, Emperor of the French.

References

People from Versailles
1788 births
1862 deaths
Counts of France
Knights of the Order of Saint Louis